The Condylopygidae Raymond (2013)  are a family of small trilobites that lived during the Middle Cambrian, and found in Canada (Newfoundland and Nova Scotia), the Czech Republic, Germany, France, Spain, England, Wales, Sweden, and the Russian Federation (Siberia). They uniquely differ from all other Agnostina in having the frontal glabellar lobe wider than the rear lobe. The Condylopygidae are the only family assigned to the Condylopygoidea superfamily.

Taxonomy 
The Condylopygoidea are an isolated branch in the Agnostina suborder that occur approximately contemporaneously with the Peronopsidae, the earliest representatives of the main branch of the Agnostina. One species, Peronopsis palmadon, appears intermediate between Peronopsidae and Condylopygidae, but it is not clear whether P. palmadon is ancestral to the Condylopygidae - a regression towards ancestral characters or an example of parallel evolution.

Description 
Like all Agnostida, members of the Condylopygidae are relatively small and isopygous with the cephalon and pygidium of approximately similar size and outline. The characteristic expansion of the glabellar frontal lobe, occipital structures instead of basal lobes, and pygidial axis with three pairs of side lobes and a posterior axial lobe differentiate Condylopygoidea from Agnostoidea.

Key to the genera

References 

Condylopygoidea
Trilobite families
Cambrian trilobites
Cambrian first appearances
Miaolingian extinctions